John W. Boehne House, also known as the Tau Kappa Epsilon Fraternity House, is a historic home located at Evansville, Indiana.  It was designed by the architecture firm Clifford Shopbell & Co. and built in 1912. It is a -story, Colonial Revival style stone sheathed dwelling.  It features a monumental front pedimented portico.  It was originally built for Congressman John W. Boehne (1856-1946) and has housed the Tau Kappa Epsilon since 1965. Tau Kappa Epsilon is no longer housed on the premises.

It was added to the National Register of Historic Places in 1983.

References

Houses on the National Register of Historic Places in Indiana
Colonial Revival architecture in Indiana
Houses completed in 1912
Houses in Evansville, Indiana
National Register of Historic Places in Evansville, Indiana